Leatherwood is an unincorporated community in Adams Township, Parke County, in the U.S. state of Indiana.

History
A post office was established at Leatherwood in 1880, and remained in operation until it was discontinued in 1894. The community took its name from nearby Leatherwood Branch creek.

Geography

References

Unincorporated communities in Parke County, Indiana
Unincorporated communities in Indiana